John Craigie (born June 15, 1980) is an American singer-songwriter and storyteller. Hailed as a "Modern-Day Troubadour" in the style of Woody Guthrie, Craigie's comedic storytelling style has been compared to Mitch Hedberg, while his music and commitment to living on the road has drawn comparisons to Guthrie, Ramblin' Jack Elliott and Pete Seeger.

He has performed with or opened for Jack Johnson, Gregory Alan Isakov, Todd Snider, Paul Thorn, James McMurtry, Shawn Colvin, Sean Hayes, Nicki Bluhm, Aoife O'Donovan, ALO, Shook Twins, Rainbow Girls, Avett Brothers, and Trampled by Turtles.

Early life 

John Craigie was born and raised in Los Angeles, California. He is the grandson of U.S. Air Force general Laurence Craigie. He attended college at UC Santa Cruz in Northern California, where he graduated with a degree in mathematics. In Santa Cruz he began performing live music in local venues and house parties, first as lead singer and guitarist in a psychedelic rock band, "Pond Rock", then solo as a folk singer-songwriter and storyteller. He self-released several albums of songs in this period before his first major studio album, 2009's Montana Tale.

Music career 

Craigie is best known for his live performances which blend folk songwriting with comedic storytelling. His 2016 live album, Capricorn In Retrograde… Just Kidding… Live in Portland, wound up on Jack Johnson's car stereo on a drive up the California coast, prompting Johnson to ask Craigie to open for him on 11 dates of his 2017 national Summer tour. Throughout the tour, Johnson brought Craigie on stage during his set to co-perform Craigie's song, "I Wrote Mr. Tambourine Man"; the pair released a single of the song, recorded live at The Greek Theatre in Berkeley, California.

Craigie has released eight studio albums, two live albums, and two cover albums. His album No Rain, No Rose, released in 2017, was recorded in his Portland-home living room, and features Gregory Alan Isakov and Shook Twins. 2020's Asterisk The Universe features Rainbow Girls and was recorded with friends in a Northern California cabin.

Discography

Studio albums
 Montana Tale (2009)
 October is the Kindest Month (2011)
 The Apocalypse Is Over (2013)
 Working On My Farewell (2015)
 No Rain, No Rose (2017)
 Scarecrow (2018)
 Asterisk The Universe (2020)
 Mermaid Salt (2022)

Live albums
 Capricorn in Retrograde...just kidding...Live in Portland (2016)
 Opening for Steinbeck (2018)

Cover albums
 Leave the Fire Behind (cover versions of 1990s alternative rock songs, 2010)
 Paper Airplane (cover versions of Led Zeppelin songs, 2012)

References

External links 
 Official Website

Living people
1980 births
American folk musicians
American folk singers
American male singer-songwriters
Musicians from Los Angeles
Singer-songwriters from California
21st-century American singers
21st-century American male singers